David M. Ronne (April 23, 1943 – January 23, 2007) was an American sound engineer. He was nominated for three Academy Awards in the category Best Sound. He worked on more than 120 films between 1966 and 2007.

Selected filmography
 On Golden Pond (1981)
 The River (1984)
 Silverado (1985)

References

External links

1943 births
2007 deaths
American audio engineers
People from Chicago
Engineers from Illinois
20th-century American engineers